Prosthecobacter fluviatilis is a bacterium from the genus Prosthecobacter.

References

Verrucomicrobiota
Bacteria described in 2008